Liolaemus basadrei is a species of lizard in the family  Liolaemidae. It is native to Peru.

References

basadrei
Reptiles described in 2021
Reptiles of Peru
Taxa named by Cristian Simón Abdala